Burnside Plantation may refer to:

Burnside Plantation (Bethlehem, Pennsylvania), listed on the NRHP in Pennsylvania
Burnside Plantation House (Williamsboro, North Carolina), listed on the NRHP in North Carolina